Fillmore is an unincorporated community located between Sand Lake and Cranberry Lake, in Benson County, North Dakota, United States.

References

Unincorporated communities in North Dakota
Populated places in Benson County, North Dakota